The 7th Ukrainian Verkhovna Rada was a session of the legislative branch of the Verkhovna Rada, Ukraine's parliament. Its composition was based on the results of the 2012 parliamentary election. Half of the seats in the parliament were apportioned between the five winning parties based on the popular vote, while the other half was apportioned between 4 parties and 44 independents between 225 constituencies throughout the country. It first met in the capital Kyiv on December 12, 2012 and ended its session on November 27, 2014 after the 8th Verkhovna Rada began its first session.

Parliamentary work was virtually paralyzed the first months of 2013 because the opposition (UDAR, Fatherland, Freedom, others) blocked the podium and presidium seats on various days. According to a study conducted by Opora, deputies did not work for 53 days during the first hundred days in the 7th convocation.

Major events

December 2012-February 2013
 December 12, 2012. Election of presidium, establishing parliamentary factions, establishing and assigning of committee, PACE Ukraine delegation, other.
 December 13, 2012. Confirming on the Presidential appointment of Mykola Azarov as the Prime Minister of Ukraine
 February 5, 2013. Parliamentary 2nd session did not start as the "opposition" (UDAR, Fatherland, Freedom, others) blocked the podium (tribune) and presidium seats in the protest of Rybak's actions and it demanded an end to the practice of deputies voting for non-present colleagues. Parliament was unblocked on 22 February 2013 after procedural measures had been implemented to prevent multiple voting.
 February 8, 2013. The Higher Administrative Court of Ukraine deprived United Centre member Pavlo Baloha (at the time a member of the Party of Regions parliamentary faction) and independent Oleksandr Dombrovsky of their deputy seats. The Court had established that the results in single-member districts number 11 (Vinnytsia Oblast; Dombrovsky) and number 71 (Zakarpattia Oblast; Baloha) during the October 2012 Ukrainian parliamentary election had been "unreliable".

March 2013-April 2013
 March 5, 2013. The Higher Administrative Court of Ukraine stripped Andrey Verevskiy (Party of Regions) of his seat in parliament because he simultaneously was parliamentary deputy and headed a commercial entity.
 March 5, 2013. Members of Fatherland blocked the podium (tribune) and presidium seats in the protest of Chairman Rybak's inquiry to the Higher Administrative Court of Ukraine on depriving Serhiy Vlasenko (Fatherland) of his seat in parliament. Parliament was unblocked on 19 March 2013.
 March 6, 2013. The Higher Administrative Court of Ukraine stripped Serhiy Vlasenko (Fatherland) of his seat in parliament because he practiced advocacy and was a people's deputy at the same time.
 March 19, 2013. Party of Regions parliamentary leader Oleksandr Yefremov accused deputies from Svoboda of being neo-fascists after they booed a speech he made in Russian, which provoked a physical altercation to erupt between the two sides.
 March 29, 2013. Party of Regions members started to gather signatures for dismissal of Ruslan Koshulynsky from the position of parliamentary vice-speaker. According to one of the Party of Regions members, Inna Bohoslovska it is done due to the fact that Svoboda is a neo-fascist party.
 April 3, 2013. Parliamentary session did not start as the "opposition" (UDAR, Fatherland, Freedom, others) blocked the podium (tribune) and presidium seats; they had three demands:
Calling mayoral elections in Kyiv
Repealing pension reform
Considering the resignation of the Cabinet of Ministers of Ukraine.
 April 4, 2013. With the blocking the podium (tribune) and presidium seats continuing pro-government legislators left the official parliament hall and voted to approve to routine pieces of legislation in a nearby building (6-8 vulytsia Bankova); according to them (chairman of parliamentary regulations committee and participants of the Bankova meeting) "the sitting of the parliament could be held in another place if legislators want". Party of Regions stated 244 deputies (in the 450-seat parliament) supported the move, but the opposition insists that number was 182. The last time the parliament split into two and held two sessions on two different premises was in 2000. One of the opposition leaders Oleh Tyahnybok pointed out to the fact that the decision to conduct a session beyond the premises of Verkhovna Rada building should be first adopted in the parliament building, citing the parliamentary regulations. Opposition also claimed that none of its representatives were allowed to attend the session at Bankova.
 April 4, 2013. Batkivschyna legislators Oleh Kanivets, Vitaliy Nemylostyvy, Roman Stadniychuk and Ihor Skosar wrote statements to Verkhovna Rada Chairman Volodymyr Rybak with an applications to withdraw from the Batkivschyna faction. Later that day (only) Nemylostyvy and Stadniychuk confirm this while Kanivets and Skosar insisted that they are still the members of the Batkivschyna faction the press service of Batkivschyna party reported. Again later that day Kanivets and Skosar released a manifesto statement they did made "the only possible decision – to leave the ranks of the faction" because (Batkivschyna faction leader) Arseniy Yatsenyuk "is leading to an intraparty split and is a politically corrupt man, who dreams of becoming a national leader."
 April 5, 2013. Parliament did not start its session, as it was still blocked; the next plenary session of the parliament is scheduled for April 16.
 April 11, 2013. Leaders of opposition factions, Yatsenyuk (Fatherland), Vitali Klitschko (UDAR) and Oleh Tyahnybok (Freedom) are due to appear in the Holosiyivsky District Court of Kyiv under a lawsuit filed by citizen Vira Ivanova due to the blocking of the Verkhovna Rada.

June 2013-September 2013
 June 6, 2013. The opposition blocked the parliaments presidium seats until President Viktor Yanukovych reports his annual address to parliament personally in parliament (he had sent a written report).
 July 7, 2013. Pavlo Baloha and Oleksandr Dombrovsky mandates were officially cancelled.
 September 3, 2013 (opening session of the Verkhovna Rada after the summer recess). President Yanukovych urged parliament to adopt laws so that Ukraine will meet the European Union (EU) criteria so Ukraine and the EU can formally sign an Association Agreement in November 2013.
 September 5, 2013. The Verkhovna Rada itself set the date of the 7 re-elections to 15 December 2013.
 September 12, 2013. The Higher Administrative Court of Ukraine deprived Rodina Party member Ihor Markov (at the time a member of the Party of Regions parliamentary faction) of his deputy seats. The Court had established that the results in single-member districts number 133 (Odessa) had been "unreliable".

Leadership

The parliament's chairman, first deputy, and deputy are all unaffiliated people's deputies according to parliamentary procedure.

Members

Single-mandate constituencies

Autonomous Republic of Crimea
Those representing Autonomous Republic of Crimea consisted of nine deputies from the Party of Regions and one from Union.
 Vitalina Dzoz (R)
 Lev Myrymsky (Union, not member of a faction)
 Olena Netetska (R)
 Oleh Paraskiv (R)
 Valentina Lyutikova (R)
 Yulia Lyovochkina (R)
 Serhiy Braiko (R)
 Borys Deich (R)
 Oleksandr Nechayev (R)
 Hryhoriy Hruba (R)

Cherkasy Oblast
Those representing Cherkasy Oblast consisted of four deputies from the Party of Regions, one Independent, and two disputed constituencies.
 Disputed
 Volodymyr Zubyk (R, elected as an independent)
 Hennadiy Bobov (R)
 Disputed
 Viktor Tymoshenko (I, not member of a faction)
 Valentyn Nychyporenko (R, elected as an independent)
 Anton Yatsenko (R)

Chernihiv Oblast
Those representing Chernihiv Oblast consisted of three deputies form the Party of Regions, one Independent, one from Fatherland, and one from the Radical Party of Oleh Lyashko.
 Valeriy Dubil (Fa)
 Vladyslav Atroshenko (R, elected as an independent)
 Ihor Rybakov (I, not member of a faction)
 Oleh Lyashko (Rad, not member of a faction)
 Ivan Kurovsky (R, elected as an independent)
 Mykola Rudkovsky (R, elected as an independent)

Changes in membership
On 18 March 2013, the Central Election Commission of Ukraine registered Roman Stadniychuk of Batkivschyna and Oleksandr Kozub of Party of Regions as people's deputies in place of Andrey Verevskiy and Serhiy Vlasenko.

In June 2013 people's deputies of Batkivschyna claimed they had been offered bribes of $2 million to $6 million for leaving the parties parliamentary faction, becoming member of the Party of Regions faction or for voting for legislation proposed by it.

Parliamentary factions and deputy groups summary

The ruling majority (225+ votes) is "situational" and officially consists of Party of Regions and most unaffiliated members. Communists are officially in opposition to everyone but its parliamentary faction usually votes exactly the same as the Party of Regions parliamentary faction. The parliamentary opposition includes UDAR, Fatherland and Freedom and other unaffiliated members.

See also
 Second Azarov Government
 First Yatsenyuk Government

References

External links
 

 
Ukrainian parliaments